Dianmu, also known as Leizi, is the Chinese goddess of lightning, who is said to have used flashing mirrors to send bolts of lightning across the sky.

She is married to Leigong, the god of thunder. She is one of the gods who work together to produce the phenomena of thunder. Other companions are Yun Tong ("Cloud Youth"), who whips up clouds, and Yu Shi ("Rain Master") who causes downpours by dipping his sword into a pot. Roaring winds rush forth from a type of goatskin bag manipulated by Fengbo ("Earl of Wind"), who was later transformed into Feng Po Po ("Lady Wind").

Legend
Dianmu was once a human, who lived with her mother. One day, she was dumping rice husks, because they were too hard for her mother to eat. When the short-tempered thunder god Leigong saw her dumping the husks out, he thought she was wasting food, so he killed her. When the Jade Emperor found out, he was infuriated at Leigong's careless murder. The Jade Emperor revived Dianmu, making her a goddess. Dianmu was made to marry Leigong, who took on the responsibility of caring for her. Dianmu's job is now to work with Lei Gong. She uses mirrors to shine light on the Earth, so Leigong can see who he hits and makes sure they aren't innocent. This is why lightning comes before thunder.

Storms
The following have been named after her:

Typhoon Dianmu (T0406, 09W, Helen) – struck Japan.
Severe Tropical Storm Dianmu (2010) (T1004, 05W, Ester)
Tropical Storm Dianmu (2016) (T1608, 11W) – struck Indochina
Tropical Storm Dianmu (2021) (T2115, 21W)

References

Chinese goddesses
Thunder goddesses